Lisneidy Inés Veitía Córdova (born 29 April 1994) is a Cuban sprinter. She competed in the 400 metres event at the 2015 World Championships in Athletics in Beijing, China. She was born in Corralillo in Villa Clara Province. She was the gold medallist in the 400 metres and 4 × 400 metres relay at the 2014 Central American and Caribbean Games. She competed at the 2020 Summer Olympics.

International competitions

References

External links
 

1994 births
Living people
People from Villa Clara Province
Cuban female sprinters
World Athletics Championships athletes for Cuba
Athletes (track and field) at the 2010 Summer Youth Olympics
Athletes (track and field) at the 2016 Summer Olympics
Olympic athletes of Cuba
Central American and Caribbean Games gold medalists for Cuba
Competitors at the 2014 Central American and Caribbean Games
Central American and Caribbean Games medalists in athletics
Athletes (track and field) at the 2015 Pan American Games
Pan American Games competitors for Cuba
Athletes (track and field) at the 2020 Summer Olympics
20th-century Cuban women
21st-century Cuban women